74P/Smirnova–Chernykh is a periodic comet in the Solar System. It fits the definition of an Encke-type comet with (TJupiter > 3; a < aJupiter), and is a Quasi-Hilda comet.  It was discovered in late March 1975 by Tamara Mikhajlovna Smirnova while examining exposures from the Crimean Astrophysical Observatory.  In the discovery images the comet had an apparent magnitude of ~15.  In the year of discovery, the comet came to perihelion on August 6, 1975.

The comet had been photographed during 1967, but was identified as an asteroid and assigned the designation 1967 EU.

The comet is estimated at about 4.46 km in diameter, and currently has an orbit contained completely inside of the orbit of Jupiter.

References

External links 
 Orbital simulation from JPL (Java) / Horizons Ephemeris
 74P at Kazuo Kinoshita's Comets
 Images of 74P/Smirnova–Chernykh from the 2009 passage

Periodic comets
Encke-type comets
0074
Comets in 2018
19750304